A mobile game, or smartphone game, is a video game that is typically played on a mobile phone.  The term also refers to all games that are played on any portable device, including from mobile phone (feature phone or smartphone), tablet, PDA to handheld game console, portable media player or graphing calculator, with and without network availability.
The earliest known game on a mobile phone was a Tetris variant on the Hagenuk MT-2000 device from 1994.

In 1997, Nokia launched Snake.  Snake, which was pre-installed in most mobile devices manufactured by Nokia, has since become one of the most played games and is found on more than 350 million devices worldwide. A variant of the Snake game for the Nokia 6110, using the infrared port, was also the first of many two-player game for mobile phones.

Today, mobile games are usually downloaded from an app store but in some cases are also preloaded in the handheld devices by the OEM or by the mobile operator when purchased, via infrared connection, Bluetooth, or memory card, or side loaded onto the handset with a cable.

Downloadable mobile games were first commercialised in Japan circa the launch of NTT DoCoMo's I-mode platform in 1999, and by the early 2000s were available through a variety of platforms throughout Asia, Europe, North America and ultimately most territories where modern carrier networks and handsets were available by the mid-2000s. However, mobile games distributed by mobile operators and third party portals (channels initially developed to monetise downloadable ringtones, wallpapers and other small pieces of content using premium SMS or direct carrier charges as a billing mechanism) remained a marginal form of gaming until Apple's iOS App Store was launched in 2008. As the first mobile content marketplace operated directly by a mobile platform holder, the App Store significantly changed the consumer behaviour and quickly broadened the market for mobile games, as almost every smartphone owner started to download mobile apps.

History

Towards the end of the 20th century, mobile phone ownership became ubiquitous in the industrialised world - due to the establishment of industry standards, and the rapid fall in cost of handset ownership, and use driven by economies of scale. As a result of this explosion, technological advancement by handset manufacturers became rapid. With these technological advances, mobile phone games also became increasingly sophisticated, taking advantage of exponential improvements in display, processing, storage, interfaces, network bandwidth and operating system functionality. The first such game that demonstrated the desire for handset games was a version of Snake that Nokia had included on its devices since 1997.

In 1999, NTT Docomo launched the i-mode mobile platform in Japan, allowing mobile games to be downloaded onto smartphones. Several Japanese video game developers announced games for the i-mode platform that year, such as Konami announcing its dating simulation Tokimeki Memorial. The same year, Nintendo and Bandai were developing mobile phone adapters for their handheld game consoles, the Game Boy Color and WonderSwan, respectively. By 2001, i-mode had  users in Japan, along with more advanced handsets with graphics comparable to 8-bit consoles. A wide variety of games were available for the i-mode service, along with announcements from established video game developers such as Taito, Konami, Namco, and Hudson Soft, including ports of classic arcade games and 8-bit console games.

The launch of Apple's iPhone in 2007 and the App Store in 2008 radically changed the market. The iPhone's focus on larger memory, multitasks, and additional sensing devices, including the touchscreen in later model, made it ideal for casual games, while the App Store made it easy for developers to create and post apps to publish, and for users to search for and obtain new games. Further, the App Store added the ability to support in-app purchases in October 2009. This allowed games like Angry Birds and Cut the Rope to find new monetization models away from the traditional premium "pay once" model. Meanwhile, Apple's disruption caused the market to stabilized around iPhone devices and Google's Android-based phones which offered a similar app store through Google Play.

A further major shift game with 2012's Candy Crush Saga and Puzzle & Dragons, games that used a stamina-like gameplay feature found in social-network games like FarmVille to limit the number of times one could play it in a single period, but allowed optional in-app purchases to restore that stamina immediately and continue playing. This new monetization brought in millions of players to both games and millions of dollars in revenue, establishing the "freemium" model that would be a common approach for many mobile game going forward. Mobile gaming grew rapidly over the next several years, buoyed by rapid expansion in China. By 2016, top mobile games were earning over  a year, and the total revenue for the mobile games sector had surpassed that of other video game areas.

Other major trends in mobile games have include the hyper-casual game such as Flappy Bird and Crossy Road and location-based games like Pokémon Go.

Mobile gaming has impacted the larger video game market by drawing demand away from handheld video game consoles; both Nintendo and Sony had seen major drops in sales of their 2011 handhelds compared to their 2004 predecessors as a result of mobile gaming. At the same time, mobile gaming introduced the concept of microconsoles, low-cost, low-powered home video game consoles that used mobile operating systems to take advantage of the wide variety of games available on these platforms.

Calculator games

Calculator gaming is a form of gaming in which games are played on programmable calculators, especially graphing calculators.

In 1980, Casio's MG-880 pocket calculator had a built-in "Invaders" game (essentially a downscaled Space Invaders clone), released in the Summer that year. Another early example is the type-in program Darth Vader's Force Battle for the TI-59, published in BYTE in October 1980. The magazine also published a version of Hunt the Wumpus for the HP-41C. Few other games exist for the earliest of programmable calculators (including the Hewlett-Packard 9100A, one of the first scientific calculators), such as the long-popular Lunar Lander game often used as an early programming exercise. However, limited program address space and lack of easy program storage made calculator gaming a rarity even as programmables became cheap and relatively easy to obtain. It was not until the early 1990s when graphing calculators became more powerful and cheap enough to be common among high school students for use in mathematics. The new graphing calculators, with their ability to transfer files to one another and from a computer for backup, could double as game consoles.

Calculators such as HP-48 and TI-82 could be programmed in proprietary programming languages such as RPL programming language or TI-BASIC directly on the calculator; programs could also be written in assembly language or (less often) C on a desktop computer and transferred to the calculator.  As calculators became more powerful and memory sizes increased, games increased in complexity.

By the 1990s, programmable calculators were able to run implementations by hobbyists of games such as Lemmings and Doom (Lemmings for HP-48 was released in 1993; Doom for HP-48 was created in 1995).  Some games such as Dope Wars caused controversy when students played them in school.

The look and feel of these games on an HP-48 class calculator, due to the lack of dedicated audio and video circuitry providing hardware acceleration, can at most be compared to the one offered by 8-bit handheld consoles such as the early Game Boy or the Gameking (low resolution, monochrome or grayscale graphics), or to the built-in games of non-Java or BREW enabled cell phones.

Games continue to be programmed on graphing calculators with increasing complexity.  A wave of games appeared after the release of the TI-83 Plus/TI-84 Plus series, among TI's first graphing calculators to natively support assembly.  TI-BASIC programming also rose in popularity after the release of third-party libraries. Assembly remained the language of choice for these calculators, which run on a Zilog Z80 processor, although some assembly implements have been created to ease the difficulty of learning assembly language.  For those running on a Motorola 68000 processor (like the TI-89), C programming (possible using TIGCC) has begun to displace assembly.

Because they are easy to program without outside tools, calculator games have survived despite the proliferation of mobile devices such as mobile phones and PDAs.

Industry structure
Total global revenue from mobile games was estimated at $2.6 billion in 2005 by Informa Telecoms and Media. Total revenue in 2008 was $5.8 billion. The largest mobile gaming markets were in the Asia-Pacific nations Japan and China, followed by the United States. In 2012, the market had already reached $7.8 billion A new report was released in November 2015 showing that 1887 app developers would make more than one million dollars on the Google and iOS app stores in 2015.

Mobile gaming revenue reached $50.4 billion in 2017, occupying 43% of the entire global gaming market and poised for further growth. It is expected to surpass the combined revenues from both PC gaming and console gaming in 2018.

Different platforms

Mobile games have been developed to run on a wide variety of platforms and technologies. These include the (today largely defunct) Palm OS, Symbian, Adobe Flash Lite, NTT DoCoMo's DoJa, Sun's Java, Qualcomm's BREW, WIPI, BlackBerry, Nook and early incarnations of Windows Mobile. Today, the most widely supported platforms are Apple's iOS and Google's Android. The mobile version of Microsoft's Windows 10 (formerly Windows Phone) is also actively supported, although in terms of market share remains marginal compared to iOS and Android.

Java was at one time the most common platform for mobile games, however its performance limits led to the adoption of various native binary formats for more sophisticated games.

Due to its ease of porting between mobile operating systems and extensive developer community, Unity is one of the most widely used engines used by modern mobile games. Apple provide a number of proprietary technologies (such as Metal) intended to allow developers to make more effective use of their hardware in iOS-native games.

Monetization

With the introduction of the iOS App Store and support for in-app purchases by October 2009, the methods through which mobile games earn revenue have diverged significantly away from traditional game models on consoles or computers. Since 2009, a number of models have developed, and a mobile game developer/publisher may use one or a combination of these models to make revenue.

Premium
The premium model is akin to the traditional model where the user pays for the full game upfront. Additional downloadable content may be available which can be purchased separately. Initial games released to the App Store before in-app purchases were available used this approach, and still common for many types of games.

Freemium
The freemium or "free to try" model offers a small portion of the game for free, comparable to a game demo. After completing this, the player is given the option to make a one-time in-app purchase to unlock the rest of the game. Early games shortly after the introduction of the in-app purchase feature used this approach such as Cut the Rope and Fruit Ninja.

Free-to-play
A free-to-play game requires no cost at all to play, and generally is designed to be playable from start to finish without having to spend any money into the game. However, the game will include gameplay mechanics which may slow progress towards completing the game. Commonly in mobile games, this is some form of energy or stamina that limits how many turns or actions a player can take each day. By using in-app purchases, the player can immediately restore their energy or stamina and continue on. In-app purchases can also be used to buy power-ups and other items to give the player a limited-time advantage to help complete the game. While free-to-play games had been common on computers prior to mobile, the method was popularized in mobile gaming with Candy Crush Saga and Puzzle & Dragons.

Advertising-supported
A ad-supported game will be free to download and play, but periodically or persistently, the game will show an advertisement to the user which they will have to watch through before they can continue with the game. The developer earns revenue from the advertising network. In some cases, an in-app purchase allows the player to fully disable ads in these games.

Subscription model
A subscription-based game will offer a base version with limited features that can be played for free, but additional premium features can be obtained if the user pays a monthly subscription fee. If they terminate their subscription, they lose access to those features, though typically not any game progression related to those features, and can pick up those features later by restarting their subscription.

Many game apps are free to play through a combination of these models. Over time, mobile developers of these types of apps have observed that the bulk of their players do not spend any funds on their game, but instead revenues are generated from a small fraction, typically under 10% of their total players. Further, most of the revenue is generated by a very small fraction, about 2%, of the total players, who routinely spend large amounts of money on the game. A similar split on revenue had been seen in social-network games played in browsers. These players are known as "whales", inspired by same term used for high rolling gamblers. The social nature of a mobile game has also been found to affect its revenue, as games that encourage players to work in teams or clans will lead to increased spending from engaged players.

Common limits of mobile games
Mobile games tend to be small in scope (in relation to mainstream PC and console games) and many prioritize innovative design and ease of play over visual spectacle. Storage and memory limitations (sometimes dictated at the platform level) place constraints on file size that presently rule out the direct migration of many modern PC and console games to mobile. One major problem for developers and publishers of mobile games is describing a game in such detail that it gives the customer enough information to make a purchasing decision.

Location-based mobile games
Games played on a mobile device using localization technology like GPS are called location-based games or location-based mobile games. These are not only played on mobile hardware but also integrate the player's position into the game concept. In other words, while it does not matter for a normal mobile game where exactly the player is (play them anywhere at any time), the player's coordinate and movement are the main elements in a location-based mobile game.

A well known example is the treasure hunt game Geocaching, which can be played on any mobile device with integrated or external GPS receiver. External GPS receivers are usually connected via Bluetooth. More and more mobile phones with integrated GPS are expected to come.

Several other location-based mobile games, such as BotFighters, are in the stage of research prototypes rather than being commercial successes.

Location-based mobile games sometimes have augmented reality functionality, such as in the case of Pokemon Go. Usually in these cases the augmented reality functionality is not at the center of the experience.

Augmented reality games

Mobile devices have been used as a platform for Augmented reality (AR in short) games, using the device's camera(s) to as an input for the game. While playing the game, the player aims the device's camera at a location and through the device's screen, sees the area captured by the camera plus computer-generated graphics atop it, augmenting the display and then allowing the player to interact that way. The graphics are generally drawn as to make the generated image appear to be part of the captured background, and will be rendered app memorizing as the player moves the device around.  The most successful and notable example for a mobile game that has an augmented reality feature is Pokémon Go (2016), where the player travels to locations marked on their GPS map and then can enable the augmented reality mode to find Pokémon creatures to capture. However, as of January 2022 there has been a lack of significant AR mobile games success since, with several AR mobile game projects being shut down, such as Microsoft's Minecraft Earth and Niantic's Catan: World Explorers

Multipurpose games 
Since mobile devices have become present in the majority of households (at least in the developed countries), there are more and more games created with educational, lifestyle and, health improvement purposes. For example, mobile games can be used in speech-language pathology, children's rehabilitation in hospitals (Finnish startup Rehaboo!), acquiring new useful or healthy habits (Habitica), memorizing things and learning languages (Memrise).

There are also apps with similar purposes which are not games per se, in this case, they are called gamified apps. Sometimes it is difficult to draw a line between multipurpose games and gamified apps.

Multiplayer mobile games

Many mobile games support multiple players, either remotely over a network or locally via Wi-Fi, Bluetooth or similar technology.

There are several options for playing multiplayer games on mobile phones: live synchronous tournaments and turn-based asynchronous tournaments. In live tournaments random players from around the world are matched together to compete. This is done using different networks such as Game Center, Google+, and Facebook.

In asynchronous tournaments, there are two methods used by game developers centered around the idea that players matches are recorded and then broadcast at a later time to other players in the same tournament. Asynchronous gameplay resolves the issue of needing players to have a continuous live connection. This gameplay is different since players take individual turns in the game, therefore allowing players to continue playing against human opponents.

This is done using different networks including Facebook. Some companies use a regular turn-based system where the end results are posted so all the players can see who won the tournament. Other companies take screen recordings of live players and broadcast them to other players at a later point in time to allow players to feel that they are always interacting with another human opponent.

Distribution
Mobile games can be distributed in one of four ways:
 Over the Air (OTA): a game binary file is delivered to the mobile device via wireless carrier networks.
 Sideloaded: a game binary file is loaded onto the phone while connected to a PC, either via USB cable or Bluetooth.
 Pre-installed: a game binary file is preloaded onto the device by the original equipment manufacturer (OEM).
 Mobile browser download: a game file is downloaded directly from a mobile website.

Until the launch of Apple App Store, in the US, the majority of mobile games were sold by wireless carriers, such as AT&T Mobility, Verizon Wireless, Sprint Corporation and T-Mobile US. In Europe, games were distributed equally between carriers and off-deck, third-party stores.

After the launch of Apple App Store, the mobile OS platforms like Apple iOS, Google Android, and Microsoft Windows Phone, the mobile OS developers themselves have launched digital download storefronts that can be run on the devices using the OS or from software used on PCs.  These storefronts (like Apple's iOS App Store) act as centralized digital download services from which a variety of entertainment media and software can be downloaded, including games and nowadays majority of games are distributed through them.

The popularity of mobile games has increased in the 2000s, as over US$3 billion worth of games were sold in 2007 internationally, and projected annual growth of over 40%. Ownership of a smartphone alone increases the likelihood that a consumer will play mobile games. Over 90% of smartphone users play a mobile game at least once a week.

Many mobile games are distributed free to the end user, but carry paid advertising: examples are Flappy Bird and Doodle Jump. The latter follows the "freemium" model, in which the base game is free but additional items for the game can be purchased separately.

See also
iPod game
Handheld electronic game
Handheld game console
Handheld video game
List of highest-grossing mobile games
List of most-played mobile games by player count
List of most-played video games by player count
Mobile software
Mobile gambling
Mobile development
 Screen protector
N-Gage (device)
Scalable Network Application Package
Transreality gaming

References

 
Game
Video game platforms
Video game terminology